Lavaei (also Romanized as Lavā’ī) is a village in Howmeh-ye Sharqi Rural District, in the Central District of Izeh County, Khuzestan Province, Iran. At the 2006 census, its population was 268, in 47 families.

References 

Populated places in Izeh County